João Victor Marcari Oliva (born 2 February 1996) is a Brazilian Olympic dressage rider. He participated at the 2016 Summer Olympics in Rio de Janeiro, Brazil, where he finished 10th in the team competition and 46th in the individual competition.

Oliva also represented Brazil at the 2014 World Equestrian Games in Normandy, France, where he finished 24th in team dressage and 85th in the individual dressage competition. In 2015, he participated at the Pan American Games, where he won a bronze medal in team dressage.

He competed at the 2020 Summer Olympics.

He is a son of Hortência Marcari, Olympic silver medalist in basketball from 1996.

References

External links

Living people
1996 births
Brazilian male equestrians
Brazilian dressage riders
Equestrians at the 2015 Pan American Games
Equestrians at the 2016 Summer Olympics
Equestrians at the 2020 Summer Olympics
Equestrians at the 2019 Pan American Games
Olympic equestrians of Brazil
Pan American Games bronze medalists for Brazil
Pan American Games medalists in equestrian
South American Games gold medalists for Brazil
South American Games medalists in equestrian
Competitors at the 2014 South American Games
Medalists at the 2015 Pan American Games
Medalists at the 2019 Pan American Games
Sportspeople from São Paulo
21st-century Brazilian people
20th-century Brazilian people